Frederick Weber Schmidt (born October 23, 1943) is an American former competition swimmer. He was Olympic champion in 4×100 m medley in 1964, and bronze medallist in 200 m butterfly. He is a former world record-holder in men's 100-meter butterfly, holding the record from 1961 to 1962.

Swimming career
Schmidt began swimming competitively at New Trier High School in Winnetka, Illinois, and was part of one of the greatest high school swim teams, in 1961.  The team won the Illinois high school championship, and various team members held every high school national record at the time.  The New Trier High School team placed third in the Amateur Athletic Union (AAU) championships that year behind the Yale and Indiana University teams.  He then joined coach Doc Counsilman's Indiana Hoosiers swimming and diving team at Indiana University.

At the 1964 Summer Olympics in Tokyo, Japan, he received a gold medal by swimming the butterfly leg for the winning U.S. team in the 4×100-meter medley relay, setting a new world record of 3:58.4 with teammates Thompson Mann (backstroke), Bill Craig (breaststroke), and Steve Clark (freestyle).  He also received a bronze medal for his third-place finish in the 200-meter butterfly, clocking a time of 2:09.3.

Schmidt held the world record in 100-meter butterfly (58.6 seconds) from August 20, 1961 to April 24, 1962.

Life outside competitive swimming 

Schmidt later entered the U.S. Navy, became a SEAL, and participated in the recovery of several capsules in NASA's manned space flight program. In 1971, when Apollo 15 returned from the moon, Schmidt welcomed mission commander David Scott, also a former competitive swimmer, back to earth.

Schmidt later moved to Guam, where he currently resides.

See also

 List of Indiana University (Bloomington) people
 List of Olympic medalists in swimming (men)
 World record progression 100 metres butterfly
 World record progression 4 × 100 metres medley relay

References

External links

1943 births
Living people
American male butterfly swimmers
World record setters in swimming
Indiana Hoosiers men's swimmers
Olympic bronze medalists for the United States in swimming
Olympic gold medalists for the United States in swimming
Sportspeople from Evanston, Illinois
Swimmers at the 1963 Pan American Games
Swimmers at the 1964 Summer Olympics
Medalists at the 1964 Summer Olympics
Pan American Games silver medalists for the United States
Pan American Games medalists in swimming
Medalists at the 1963 Pan American Games